St. John's Church, Tartu is a Brick Gothic Lutheran church, one of the landmarks of the city of  Tartu, Estonia. It is dedicated to John the Baptist.

History
Initially, St John's was a Catholic church, as the oldest parts of the current building originate from the 14th century. Before that, there has been a church building on the same place at least since the first half of the 13th century. Archaeological investigations have indicated that there may well have been a wooden church here in the 12th century. This is particularly remarkable because the national Christianisation did not take place until much later. The red brick building has seen extensive changes, as it was largely rebuilt after both the Great Northern War and World War II. Baroque chapels were added in 1746 and 1769. The church is now part of the Estonian Evangelical Lutheran Church.

The Great Fire of Tartu started near the church in 1775 and the church and nearby Uppsala House were spared the destruction which destroyed nearly two hundred houses.

At the end of the 19th century the church supplied primary education. The actress Amalie Konsa received her only schooling here.

Description
The most outstanding feature of St. John's is its wealth of terracotta figurines surrounding the church's exterior. Originally, there were more than a thousand hand-made figurines, each different from the others; now, about 200 have survived. The large number of individual figurines has given birth to the hypotheses that they might have been modelled after citizens of Tartu; on the other hand, some of them wear crowns, which hints they might depict someone else.

Since 1999, St John's Church has two new bells named Peetrus and Paulus after city's two patron saints (respectively, St. Peter and St. Paul).

See also
 Architecture of Estonia
 List of Brick Gothic buildings

References

External links
 
 Church website (in English).

14th-century churches
Lutheran churches in Estonia
Buildings and structures in Tartu
Brick Gothic
Gothic architecture in Estonia
14th-century establishments in Estonia
Tourist attractions in Tartu
Churches in Tartu